John Allen Parkinson  (15 October 1870 – 7 December 1941) was a British Labour Party politician and former coal miner. He stood for Parliament seven times and was overwhelmingly elected each time.

Biography
Parkinson was born in Hindley Green, Lancashire, and worked as a coal miner in the Lancashire Coalfield. He entered politics in 1908, when he was elected as a member of the Urban District Council in Abram, He then served many years on the Lancashire County Council. In 1917, he was appointed miners' agent for the Lancashire and Cheshire Miners' Federation.

Parkinson was elected to the House of Commons as Member of Parliament (MP) for Wigan at the 1918 general election supported by the Miners' Federation of Great Britain, replacing the Conservative MP Reginald Neville. He served as a Lord Commissioner of the Treasury in Prime Minister Ramsay MacDonald's second and third ministries. He stayed active in the mining industry throughout his life, and was a member of a 1930 Parliamentary delegation that traveled to Northern Rhodesia to investigate working conditions in the copper-mining industry.

Parkinson was re-elected at each subsequent general election until his death in Orrell at the age of 71 in 1941, when he became the first of four Wigan MPs to die in office in the 20th century. In the consequent by-election in 1942, the seat was held for Labour by William Foster.  Wigan has returned Labour MPs ever since.

Parkinson was twice married; his first wife  Alice (née Pilkington) died in 1904. He married Ida (née Atkinson) the following year.

He was made a Commander of the Order of the British Empire in the 1931 New Year Honours.

References

External links 
 

1870 births
1941 deaths
Members of Lancashire County Council
Labour Party (UK) MPs for English constituencies
Miners' Federation of Great Britain-sponsored MPs
UK MPs 1918–1922
UK MPs 1922–1923
UK MPs 1923–1924
UK MPs 1924–1929
UK MPs 1929–1931
UK MPs 1931–1935
UK MPs 1935–1945
Commanders of the Order of the British Empire
British coal miners
People from Hindley, Greater Manchester
Members of the Parliament of the United Kingdom for Wigan